Udemy, Inc. is an education technology company that provides an online learning and teaching platform. It was founded in May 2010 by Eren Bali, Gagan Biyani, and Oktay Caglar.

As of December 2022, the platform has 59 million learners, over 200,000 courses, and more than 70,000 instructors teaching courses in nearly 75 languages. There have been over 800 million course enrollments. 

There are nearly 14,000 Udemy Business customers, and more than 50% of the Fortune 100 are Udemy Business customers. Udemy Business customers have access to more than 20,000 courses, more than 8,000 of which are in English. 

Students take courses primarily to improve job-related skills. Some courses generate credit toward technical certification. Udemy attracts corporate trainers seeking to create coursework for employees of their company.

Udemy is headquartered in San Francisco, California with hubs in Denver, Colorado; Dublin, Ireland; Ankara, Turkey; São Paulo, Brazil; and Gurugram, India.

History
In 2007, Udemy (you-de-mee, portmanteau of you + academy) founders Eren Bali and Oktay Caglar built a software for a live virtual classroom while living in Turkey. They saw potential in making the product free for everyone, and moved to Silicon Valley to found a company two years later. The site was launched by Bali, Oktay Caglar and Gagan Biyani in early 2010.

In February 2010, the founders tried to raise venture capital funding, but the idea failed to impress investors and they were rejected 30 times, according to Gagan Biyani. In response to this, they bootstrapped the development of the product and launched Udemy—"The Academy of You"—in May 2010.

Within a few months, 1,000 instructors had created about 2,000 courses, and Udemy had nearly 10,000 registered users. Based on this favorable market reaction, they decided to attempt another round of financing, and raised $1 million in venture funding by August.

In October 2011, the company raised an additional $3 million in Series A funding led by Groupon investors Eric Lefkofsky and Brad Keywell, as well as 500 Global (previously 500 Startups) and MHS Capital.

In December 2012, the company raised $12 million in Series B funding led by Insight Venture Partners, as well as Lightbank Capital, MHS Capital and Learn Capital, bringing Udemy's total funding to $16 million. On April 22, 2014, the Wall Street Journals digital edition reported that Chief Operating Officer of Udemy, Dennis Yang, was named CEO, replacing Eren Bali.

In May 2014, Udemy raised another $32 million in a Series C funding, led by Norwest Venture Partners, as well as Insight Venture Partners and MHS Capital.

In June 2015, Udemy raised a $65 million Series D financing round, led by Stripes. Udemy joined another online learning house Skillsdox Inc of Canada to open up School of Skills in India.

In June 2016, Udemy raised $60 million from Naspers Ventures as a follow-up to the $65 million Series D round of financing from June 2015.

On February 5, 2019, Udemy announced that the board of the company appointed Gregg Coccari as its new chief executive officer.

In February 2020, Udemy raised $50 million from long-time partner in Japan, Benesse Holdings, Inc. and announced $2 billion valuation.

In November 2020, Udemy raised $50 million at a $3.25 billion valuation led by Tencent Holdings.

On October 29, 2021, Udemy held their IPO in the US and is listed under the symbol UDMY.

Finances
Udemy has not yet generated a profit as is common among high-growth startups who invest heavily in their own growth. Udemy reported net losses of $69.7 million for 2019 and $77.6 million in net losses for 2020. By June 30, 2021, Udemy had an accumulated deficit of $407.9 million. In 2020, Udemy spent $192.6 million on marketing and advertising.

Branding 

In 2021, Udemy changed its branding to the current look with an inverted purple chevron above the company's trademarked name in bolded lowercase letters and black coloration.

Previously it had been, over time, styled in a number of different ways including a similar logo in bright green (as seen here) without any letter accents. One example of very early logo design used larger text and capitalized the U in 'Udemy' in addition to a large, stylized red U to the left side.

Overview
Udemy is a platform that allows instructors to build online courses on their preferred topics. Using Udemy's course development tools, instructors can upload videos, source code for developers, PowerPoint presentations, PDFs, audio, ZIP files and any other content that learners might find helpful. Instructors can also engage and interact with users via online discussion boards.

Courses are offered across a wide breadth of categories, including business and entrepreneurship, academics, the arts, health and fitness, language, music, and technology. Most classes are in practical subjects such as AWS and Azure training, Excel software or using an iPhone camera. Udemy also offers Udemy Business (formerly Udemy for Business), enabling businesses access to a targeted suite of over 20,000 courses on topics from digital marketing tactics to office productivity, design, management, programming, and more. With Udemy Business, organizations can also create custom learning portals for corporate training. For smaller companies, Udemy offers a Udemy Team Plan that is a limited seat license but identical content to that of Udemy Business. 

Courses on Udemy can be paid or free, depending on the instructor. In 2015, the top 10 instructors made more than $17 million in total revenue.

In April 2013, Udemy offered an app for Apple iOS, allowing students to take classes directly from iPhones; The Android version was launched in January 2014. As of January 2014, the iOS app had been downloaded over 1 million times, and 20 percent of Udemy users access their courses via mobile. In July 2016, Udemy expanded their iOS platform to include Apple TV.  On January 11, 2020, the Udemy mobile app became the #1 top grossing Android app in India.

Udemy is sometimes seen as part of the MOOC movement available outside the traditional university system, providing an option for students who want to delve into complicated university level courses while studying on their own time.

Reception
Udemy has been mentioned in The New York Times, The China Post, Fast Company, the BBC, YPN and TechCrunch, with Mashable noting "Udemy offers an experience that rivals the real classroom, and should prove to be a useful utility for teachers and students of all subject matters."

In 2014, Forbes named Udemy co-founder Eren Bali as part of their "30 Under 30" of "the brightest stars in 15 different fields under the age of 30."

In 2020, Udemy Ranked on the Annual 'Change the World' List by Fortune Magazine. 

Udemy has been recognized in 2019, 2020, 2021, and 2022 as Bay Area Best Place to Work.

Piracy concerns
In November 2015, Udemy was accused of publishing and profiting from pirated courses. The CEO at the time, Dennis Yang, responded to the accusations in a blog post and stated that Udemy did not profit from that instance of piracy.

References

External links 

2010 establishments in California
500 Startups companies
American educational websites
Companies based in San Francisco
Education companies established in 2010
Educational technology companies of the United States
Internet properties established in 2010
Learning management systems
Virtual learning environments
2021 initial public offerings
Companies listed on the Nasdaq